The International Society for Contemporary Music (ISCM) is a music organization that promotes contemporary classical music.

The organization was established in Salzburg in 1922 as Internationale Gesellschaft für Neue Musik (IGNM) following the
Internationale Kammermusikaufführungen Salzburg, a festival of modern chamber music held as part of the Salzburg Festival. 
It was founded by the Austrian (later British) composer Egon Wellesz and the Cambridge academic Edward J Dent, who first met when Wellesz visited England in 1906.

In 1936 the rival Permanent Council for the International Co-operation of Composers, set up under Richard Strauss, was accused of furthering Nazi Party cultural ambitions in opposition to the non-political ISCM. British composer Herbert Bedford, acting as co-Secretary, defended its neutrality.

Aside from hiatuses in 1940 and 1943-5 due to World War II and in 2020–21 due to the global COVID-19 pandemic, the ISCM's core activity has been an annual festival of contemporary classical music held every year at a different location, the first of which took place in 1923 in Salzburg, which has come to be known as the ISCM World Music Days (sometimes World New Music Days, abbreviated either WMD or WNMD depending on which name is used). There have been a total of 92 of these thus far, the most recent of which took place in Tallinn, Estonia in May 2019.  The 2021 WMD in Shanghai and Nanning has been postponed until March 2022 and the 2022 WNMD is scheduled to take place in New Zealand in August 2022.Each year, during the World Music Days. ISCM members also convene in a General Assembly. Membership in the ISCM is organized through national sections that promote contemporary music in each country. These sections are usually organizations independent from the ISCM that send delegates to the ISCM General Assembly. Each member of the national section is also a member of ISCM and may send in 6 works that are evaluated for performance at the World Music Days. National organizations that promote contemporary music, but have not been designated as the nation section of ISCM, are sometimes given an associate membership status. This status also applies to the members of these organizations. Some individual music professionals receive the "honorary membership" status. The ISCM is governed by an Executive Committee consisting of seven people; two (Secretary General and Treasurer) are appointed positions and the remaining five (President, Vice President, and three regular members) are chosen from and by the delegates in an election during the General Assembly.
 
Since 1991, the ISCM has also published an annual World New Music Magazine, a print publication that is distributed to its members for further dissemination. A total of 28 issues have been produced. Recent magazine issues are available as digitally downloadable PDFs from the ISCM's website. ISCM is a member of the International Music Council. The current members of the Executive Committee of the ISCM (as of the September 2021 General Assembly which took place over Zoom) are: Glenda Keam (New Zealand), President; Frank J. Oteri (USA), Vice President; Oľga Smetanova (Slovakia), Secretary General; David Pay (Canada), Treasurer; George Kentros (Sweden), Tomoko Fukui (Japan), and Irina Hasnaș (Romania).

ISCM World Music Days 
Source:

 1923 in Salzburg
 1924 in Prague/Salzburg
 1925 in Prague/Venedig
 1926 in Zürich
 1927 in Frankfurt am Main
 1928 in Siena
 1929 in Genf
 1930 in Liège/Brüssel
 1931 in Oxford/London
 1932 in Wien
 1933 in Amsterdam
 1934 in Florenz
 1935 in Prague
 1936 in Barcelona
 1937 in Paris
 1938 in London
 1939 in Warschau/Krakau
 1941 in New York
 1942 in San Francisco
 1946 in London
 1947 in Kopenhagen/Lund
 1948 in Amsterdam/Scheveningen
 1949 in Palermo/Taormina
 1950 in Brüssel
 1951 in Frankfurt am Main
 1952 in Salzburg
 1953 in Oslo
 1954 in Haifa
 1955 in Baden-Baden
 1956 in Stockholm
 1957 in Zürich
 1958 in Straßburg
 1959 in Rom/Neapel
 1960 in Köln
 1961 in Wien
 1962 in London
 1963 in Amsterdam
 1964 in Kopenhagen
 1965 in Madrid
 1966 in Stockholm
 1967 in Prague
 1968 in Warschau
 1969 in Hamburg
 1970 in Basel
 1971 in London
 1972 in Graz
 1973 in Reykjavík
 1974 in Rotterdam/Utrecht/Amsterdam/Den Haag/Hilversum
 1975 in Paris
 1976 in Boston
 1977 in Bonn
 1978 in Stockholm/Helsinki
 1979 in Athens
 1980 in Jerusalem/Tel Aviv/Be’er Scheva/Kibbuz Schefajim
 1981 in Bruxelles/Gent
 1982 in Graz
 1983 in Århus
 1984 in Toronto/Montreal
 1985 in Nederlands
 1986 in Budapest
 1987 in Köln/Bonn/Frankfurt am Main
 1988 in Hongkong
 1989 in Amsterdam
 1990 in Oslo
 1991 in Zürich
 1992 in Warszawa
 1993 in Ciudad de Mexico
 1994 in Stockholm
 1995 in Essen/Bochum/Dortmund/Duisburg (Ruhrgebiet)
 1996 in Kopenhagen
 1997 in Seoul
 1998 in Manchester
 1999 in Romania/Moldavia
 2000 in Luxembourg
 2001 in Yokohama
 2002 in Hongkong
 2003 in Slovenija
 2004 in Switzerland
 2005 in Zagreb
 2006 in Stuttgart
 2007 in Hongkong
 2008 in Vilnius
 2009 in Sverige
 2010 in Sydney
 2011 in Zagreb
 2012 in Belgie
 2013 in Košice/Bratislava/Wien
 2014 in Wroclaw
 2015 in Slovenia
 2016 in Tongyeong
 2017 in Vancouver
 2018 in Peking
 2019 in Tallinn
 2020 in Auckland/Christchurch, postponed to 2022
 2021 in Shanghai/Nanning, postponed to 2022
 2022 in Shanghai/Nanning und Auckland/Christchurch
 2023 in Johannesburg/Soweto

ISCM Honorary Members 
Source:

 Louis Andriessen
 Milton Babbitt
 Béla Bartók
 Sten Broman
 Ferruccio Busoni
 John Cage
 Elliott Carter
 Alfredo Casella
 Friedrich Cerha
 Chou Wen-chung
 Edward Clar
 Paul Collaer
 Aaron Copland
 Luigi Dallapiccola
 Edward Dent
 Franz Eckert
 Óscar Esplá
 Manuel de Falla
 Michael Finnissy
 Vinko Globokar
 Sofia Gubaidulina
 Alois Hába
 Anton Haefeli
 Ernst Henschel
 Paul Hindemith
 Arthur Honegger
 Klaus Huber
 Sukhi Kang
 Zoltán Kodály
 Charles Koechlin
 Zygmunt Krauze
 Ernst Křenek
 György Kurtág
 André Laporte
 Doming Lam
 György Ligeti
 Witold Lutosławski
 Walter Maas
 Gian Francesco Malipiero
 Yori-Aki Matsudaira
 Arne Mellnäs
 Olivier Messiaen
 Darius Milhaud
 Conlon Nancarrow
 Arne Nordheim
 Per Nørgård
 Vítězslav Novák
 Reinhard Oehlschlägel
 Arvo Pärt
 Krzysztof Penderecki
 Goffredo Petrassi
 Willem Pijper
 Maurice Ravel
 Hans Rosbaud
 Hilding Rosenberg
 Albert Roussel
 Antonio Rubin
 Kaija Saariaho
 Paul Sacher
 Hermann Scherchen
 R. Murray Schafer
 Arnold Schönberg
 Roger Sessions
 Jean Sibelius
 Igor Stravinsky
 Karol Szymanowski
 Toru Takemitsu
 Chris Walraven
 Ralph Vaughan Williams
 Iannis Xenakis
 Isang Yun
 Jōji Yuasa

ISCM ExCom (Update: June 27th 2020) 
 Glenda Keam, New Zealand (President)
 Frank J. Oteri, New Music USA (Vice President)
 George Kentros, Sweden
 Irina Hasnas, Romania
 Tomoko Fukui, Japan
 David Pay, Music on Main/Canada (Treasurer)
 Olga Smetanova, Slovakia (Secretary General)

ISCM World Music Days jury members 
Source:

 Ernest Ansermet, 1923, 1924, 1929, 1932, 1936, 1938
 Béla Bartók, 1924
 Alban Berg, 1928, 1931
 Nadia Boulanger, 1932, 1934, 1951
 Pierre Boulez, 1961
 Elliott Carter, 1954, 1960, 1963, 1976
 Alfredo Casella, 1924, 1925, 1928, 1931, 1934
 Aaron Copland, 1942
 Luigi Dallapiccola, 1950, 1953, 1966
 Franco Donatoni, 1971, 1975
 Henri Dutilleux, 1956, 1962, 1967
 Brian Ferneyhough, 1978
 Luc Ferrari, 1972
 Wolfgang Fortner, 1958, 1960, 1969
 Vinko Globokar, 1972
 Alois Hába, 1927, 1932, 1938, 1958, 1961
 Cristóbal Halffter, 1968, 1970, 1975, 1980
 Roman Haubenstock-Ramati, 1980
 Arthur Honegger, 1926
 Klaus Huber, 1965, 1969
 Jacques Ibert, 1930, 1937, 1948
 Zoltán Kodály, 1925
 Marek Kopelent, 1977
 Ernst Křenek, 1934, 1941
 Rafael Kubelík, 1947
 Helmut Lachenmann, 1981
 Rolf Liebermann, 1955, 1957
 György Ligeti, 1966, 1972
 Witold Lutosławski, 1959, 1964, 1966, 1968, 1971
 Gian Francesco Malipiero, 1930, 1933, 1949
 Olivier Messiaen, 1955
 Darius Milhaud, 1938, 1942
 Maurice Ravel, 1929
 Aribert Reimann, 1976
 Wolfgang Rihm, 1977
 Frederic Rzewski, 1981
 Hermann Scherchen, 1923, 1926, 1935
 Dieter Schnebel, 1977
 Erwin Schulhoff, 1930
 Mátyás Seiber, 1953, 1955, 1958
 Kazimierz Serocki, 1961, 1969
 Heinrich Strobel, 1955
 Hans Heinz Stuckenschmidt, 1951
 Karol Szymanowski, 1926
 Anton Webern, 1932, 1936
 Egon Wellesz, 1923, 1925
 Christian Wolff, 1977
 Iannis Xenakis, 1975

Significant premieres at ISCM World Music Days 
Source:

 1923, Salzburg, Paul Hindemith, Quintett für Streichquartett und Klarinette, op. 30 (Amar Quartet)
 1923, Salzburg, William Walton, Streichquartett Nr. 1
 1924, Prague, Arnold Schönberg, Erwartung, op. 17 (Alexander von Zemlinsky)
 1924, Prague, Alexander von Zemlinsky, Lyrische Suite, op. 18
 1924, Salzburg, Ernst Křenek, Streichquartett Nr. 4, op. 24
 1924, Salzburg, Paul Hindemith, Streichtrio, op. 34
 1925, Venezia, Hanns Eisler, Duo für Vl/Vc
 1926, Zürich, Anton Webern, 5 Stücke für Orchester, op. 10
 1935, Prague, Karl Amadeus Hartmann, Miserae
 1935, Prague, Anton Webern, Konzert für 9 Instrumente, op. 24
 1936, Barcelona, Alban Berg, Violinkonzert (Louis Krasner)
 1936, Barcelona, Ernst Křenek, Fragmente aus Karl V.
 1938, London, Anton Webern, Kantate Das Augenlicht, op. 26
 1946, London, Anton Webern, Kantate Nr. 1, op. 29
 1950, Bruxelles, Anton Webern, Kantate Nr. 2, op. 32
 1954, Haifa, André Jolivet, Symphonie Nr. 1
 1955, Baden-Baden, Pierre Boulez, Le Marteau sans Maître (SWF-Orchester Baden-Baden)
 1957, Zürich, Arnold Schönberg, Moses und Aron (stage premiere)
 1960, Köln, Mauricio Kagel, Anagrama
 1960, Köln, György Ligeti, Apparitions
 1960, Köln, Karlheinz Stockhausen, Kontakte
 1960, Köln, Isang Yun, Streichquartett Nr. 3
 1960, Köln, Bernd Alois Zimmermann, Nobody knows, Konzert für Trompete
 1961, Wien, Krzysztof Penderecki, Dimensionen der Zeit und Stille
 1962, London, Klaus Huber, Cujus Legibus Rotantur Poli
 1963, Amsterdam, Heinz Holliger, Kantate Erde und Himmel
 1967, Prague, Alois Hába, Streichquartett Nr. 16
 1968, Warszawa, Friedrich Cerha, Spiegel I
 1975, Paris, Peter Růžička, Befragung
 1982, Graz, Dieter Schnebel, Thanatos Eros II
 1982, Graz, Christoph Delz, Die Atmer der Lydia
 1982, Graz, Heinz Holliger, Jahreszeiten (Arnold Schoenberg Chor, Erwin Ortner)
 1982, Graz, Roman Haubenstock-Ramati, Nocturnes II
 1982, Graz, Conlon Nancarrow, Piece for Small Orchestra, String Quartet, Study Nr. 3a, 10, 12, 21, 25, 36, 37, 40b, 41c, 43 for Player Piano
 1982, Graz, Michael Nyman, A Handsom-Smooth-Sweet-Clear-Stroke: Or Else Play not at All (ORF-Sinfonie Orchester Wien, Lothar Zagrosek)
 1983, Aarhus, Hans Werner Henze, 3 Concerti Piccoli
 1983, Aarhus, Witold Lutosławski, Symphony Nr. 3
 1983, Aarhus, Pascal Dusapin, String Quartet (Arditti Quartet)
 1983, Aarhus, Iannis Xenakis, Tetra (Arditti Quartet)
 1984, Toronto/Montreal, Vinko Globokar, Laboratorium
 1987, Köln/Bonn/Frankfurt am Main, Giacinto Scelsi, Uaxuctum (Kölner Rundfunkchor, Kölner Rundfunk-Sinfonieorchester, Hans Zender)
 1987, Köln/Bonn/Frankfurt am Main, Dieter Schnebel, Stichworte – Stichnoten (Dieter Schnebel)
 1987, Köln/Bonn/Frankfurt am Main, Vinko Globokar, Les Emigrés
 1987, Köln/Bonn/Frankfurt am Main, John Cage, Music for 13
 1989, Amsterdam, Michael Jarrell, Assonance III
 1990, Oslo, Unsuk Chin, Troerinnen
 1990, Oslo, György Kurtág, Ligatura – Message to Frances-Marie: The Answered Unanswered Question
 1995, Ruhrgebiet, György Kurtág, Three Messages (Kölner Rundfunk-Sinfonieorchester)
 1995, Ruhrgebiet, Toshio Hosokawa, Super Flumina Babylonis (Ensemble Modern, Eberhard Kloke)
 1995, Ruhrgebiet, Walter Zimmermann, Diastasis (Ensemble Modern, Eberhard Kloke)
 1995, Ruhrgebiet, Chaya Czernowin, Amber
 1995, Ruhrgebiet, Kunsu Shim, (untitled)
 1998, Manchester, Peter Maxwell Davies, Il Rozzo Martello (BBC Singers)
 2000, Luxembourg, Wolfgang Rihm, Jagden und Formen, Zustand X/2000 (Ensemble Modern)
 2004, Switzerland, Johannes Schöllhorn, Rote Asche
 2006, Stuttgart, Georges Aperghis, Wölfli Kantata (Neue Vocalsolisten Stuttgart, SWR Vokalensemble)
 2006, Stuttgart, Francesco Filidei, Altro Recercar
 2006, Stuttgart, Jennifer Walshe, passenger
 2006, Stuttgart, Samir Odeh-Tamimi, LÁMA POÍM
 2006, Stuttgart, Younghi Pagh-Paan, Mondschatten (Staatsoper, Staatsorchester Stuttgart)
 2013, Kosice/Bratislava/Wien, Bernhard Lang, Monadologie XXIV…The Stoned Guest
 2014, Wroclaw, Slawomir Kupczak, Symphony Nr. 2 für 100 Motorräder, elektrische Gitarre, Perkussion und Elektronik
 2015, Ljubljana, Nina Senk, Into the Shades
 2016, Tongyeong, Yejune Synn, Zoetrope (Changwon Philharmonic Orchestra)
 2016, Tongyeong, Nick Roth, Woodland Heights (Hong Kong New Music Ensemble)

Significant performances at ISCM World Music Days 
Source:

 1923, Salzburg, Arnold Schönberg, Die hängenden Gärten, op. 15
 1923, Salzburg, Alban Berg, Streichquartett, op. 3
 1924, Prague, Arthur Honegger, Pacific 231
 1924, Prague, Sergei Prokofiev, Violin Concerto
 1924, Prague, Igor Stravinsky, Chant du Rossignol
 1925, Venezia, Maurice Ravel, Tzigane für Vl/Kl
 1925, Venezia, Igor Stravinsky, Piano Sonata
 1926, Zürich, Paul Hindemith, Konzert für Orchester, op. 38
 1926, Zürich, Kurt Weill, Violinkonzert, op. 12
 1929, Genève, Leoš Janáček, Glagolitic Mass
 1931, London, Anton Webern, Symphonie, op. 21
 1933, Amsterdam, Igor Strawinsky, Symphonie des Psaumes
 1934, Firenze, Maurice Ravel, Piano Concerto for the left hand
 1935, Prague, Alban Berg, Lulu-Suite
 1935, Prague, Arnold Schönberg, Variationen für Orchester, op. 31
 1938, London, Olivier Messiaen, La Nativité du Seigneur
 1942, San Francisco, Paul Hindemith, Symphonie in Es
 1946, London, Béla Bartók, Konzert für Orchester
 1946, London, Olivier Messiaen, Quatuor pour la Fin du Temps
 1946, London, Arnold Schönberg, Ode an Napoleon Bonaparte, op. 41
 1951, Frankfurt am Main, Olivier Messiaen, 5 Rechants
 1952, Salzburg, Bernd Alois Zimmermann, Violinkonzert
 1953, Oslo, Zoltán Kodály, Konzert für Orchester
 1966, Stockholm, Karlheinz Stockhausen, Kontra-Punkte Nr. 1
 1957, Zürich, Karl Amadeus Hartmann, Symphonie Nr. 6
 1958, Strassbourg, Bernd Alois Zimmermann, Symphonie
 1959, Roma, Luigi Nono, Incontri per 24 strumenti
 1959, Napoli, Igor Stravinsky, Agon
 1959, Napoli, Igor Stravinsky, Pribaoutki
 1959, Napoli, Karlheinz Stockhausen, Klavierstück XI
 1959, Napoli, Karlheinz Stockhausen, Gesang der Jünglinge
 1960, Köln, Karl Amadeus Hartmann, Symphonie Nr. 7
 1960, Köln, Darius Milhaud, Symphonie Nr. 8
 1961, Wien, Roman Haubenstock-Ramati, Séquences
 1961, Wien, Edgar Varèse, Arcana
 1963, Amsterdam, Karl Amadeus Hartmann, Symphonie Nr. 8
 1963, Amsterdam, Pierre Boulez, Piano Sonata Nr. 2
 1963, Amsterdam, Krzysztof Penderecki, Threnos
 1964, Kopenhagen, Edgar Varèse, Offrandes
 1965, Madrid, Krzysztof Penderecki, Stabat mater
 1965, Madrid, Arnold Schönberg, A Survivor from Warsaw, op. 46
 1966, Stockholm, Karlheinz Stockhausen, Mikrophonie II
 1966, Stockholm, Edgar Varèse, Octandre
 1968, Warschau, Klaus Huber, Tenebrae
 1968, Warszawa, György Ligeti, Requiem
 1969, Hamburg, Roman Haubenstock-Ramati, Symphonie „K“
 1969, Hamburg, Helmut Lachenmann, Consolation II
 1969, Hamburg, Bernd Alois Zimmermann, Présence
 1971, London, György Ligeti, Kammerkonzert
 1971, London, Salvatore Sciarrino, …Da und Divertimento
 1971, London, Iannis Xenakis, Atrées
 1972, Graz, Mauricio Kagel, Repertoire (from: ’'Staatstheater)
 1972, Graz, Witold Lutosławski, Concerto for Violoncello and Orchestra
 1972, Graz, Dieter Schnebel, Glossolalie 1980, Jerusalem, György Ligeti, Concerto for Violoncello
 1981, Bruxelles/Gent, Brian Ferneyhough, Time and Motion Study I 1981, Bruxelles/Gent, George Crumb, Eleven Echoes of Autumn 1981, Bruxelles/Gent, Vinko Globokar, La Tromba è mobile 1981, Bruxelles/Gent, Younghi Pagh-Paan, Sori 1982, Graz, Hans Werner Henze, Ragtime und Habaneras
 1982, Graz, Mauricio Kagel, Fürst Igor, Strawinsky (Mauricio Kagel, Manos Tsangaris)
 1982, Graz, György Ligeti, Atmosphères (Wiener Symphoniker)
 1982, Graz, John Cage, Credo in US 1982, Graz, Pierre Boulez, Improvisation sur Mallarmé II 1982, Graz, Karlheinz Stockhausen, Kreuzspiel 1982, Graz, Cornelius Cardew, We Think for the Future (Frederic Rzewski)
 1982, Graz, Luigi Nono, Polifonia, Monodia, Ritmica 1982, Graz, Luciano Berio, Entrata/Encore 1982, Graz, Sonny Rollins, Quintet 1983, Aarhus, Giacinto Scelsi, String Quartet Nr. 4 (Arditti Quartet)
 1983, Aarhus, Brian Ferneyhough, String Quartet Nr. 2 (Arditti Quartet)
 1983, Aarhus, Karlheinz Stockhausen, Mantra 1983, Aarhus, Steve Reich, Music for Mallet Instruments, Voices and Organ 1983, Aarhus, Georges Aperghis, Récitations pour voix seule (Nos. 1,2,3,8,9,10,14)
 1983, Aarhus, Arvo Pärt, Fratres 1983, Aarhus, Louis Andriessen, Workers Union 1983, Aarhus, Klaus Huber, Beati Pauperes II (1979)
 1983, Aarhus, Tristan Murail, Gondwana 1983, Aarhus, Ernst Křenek, Arc of Life (op. 234, 1981)
 1983, Aarhus, Adriana Hölszky, Space 1983, Aarhus, Mauricio Kagel, Dressur 1984, Toronto/Montreal, Jonty Harrison, Klang 1984, Toronto/Montreal, Francis Dhomont, Points de fuite 1984, Toronto/Montreal, Unsuk Chin, Gestalten 1984, Toronto/Montreal, Isang Yun, Exemplum in memoriam Kwangju 1984, Toronto/Montreal, Brian Ferneyhough, Adagissimo (Arditti Quartet)
 1984, Toronto/Montreal, György Kurtág, Quatuor op. 1 (Arditti Quartet)
 1985, Netherlands, Klaus Huber, …Nudo que ansi juntaís… 1985, Netherlands, Luciano Berio, Fa-Si 1985, Netherlands, Kaija Saariaho, Verblendungen für grosses Orchester und Zuspielband
 1985, Netherlands, Helmut Lachenmann, Movement – vor der Erstarrung (Ensemble Modern, Lothar Zagrosek)
 1985, Netherlands, Karlheinz Stockhausen, Klavierstück XII
 1986, Budapest, Luigi Nono, A Carlo Scarpa architetto ai suoi infiniti possibili 1986, Budapest, Samuel Beckett, Acte sans paroles (I. Thirst, II. Mr. A and Mr. B)
 1986, Budapest, György Ligeti, Aventures 1987, Köln/Bonn/Frankfurt am Main, Giacinto Scelsi, Ein Blitzstrahl… und der Himmel öffnete sich (Kölner Rundfunkchor, Kölner Rundfunk-Sinfonieorchester, Hans Zender)
 1987, Köln/Bonn/Frankfurt am Main, Giacinto Scelsi, Hurqualia – Ein anderes Königreich (Kölner Rundfunk-Sinfonieorchester, Hans Zender)
 1987, Köln/Bonn/Frankfurt am Main, Giacinto Scelsi, Hymnos (Kölner Rundfunk-Sinfonieorchester, Hans Zender)
 1987, Köln/Bonn/Frankfurt am Main, Carola Bauckholt, Die faule Vernunft 1987, Köln/Bonn/Frankfurt am Main, Hans Zender, Hölderlin lesen 1987, Köln/Bonn/Frankfurt am Main, Luigi Nono, Fragmente – Stille an Diotima 1987, Köln/Bonn/Frankfurt am Main, The Lost Chord’' (Phil Minton, Christian Marclay, Günter Christmann, Torsten Müller)
 1987, Köln/Bonn/Frankfurt am Main, Christian Wolff, Long Peace March (Ensemble Modern, Ingo Metzmacher)
 1987, Köln/Bonn/Frankfurt am Main, Iannis Xenakis, Jalons (Ensemble InterContemporain, Arturo Tamayo)
 1987, Köln/Bonn/Frankfurt am Main, Klaus Huber, Erinnere dich an G... (Ensemble InterContemporain, Arturo Tamayo)
 1987, Köln/Bonn/Frankfurt am Main, Pascal Dusapin, Niobé ou le rocher de Sipyle (Ensemble InterContemporain, Arturo Tamayo)
 1987, Köln/Bonn/Frankfurt am Main, Michael Gielen, Ein Tag tritt hervor
 1987, Köln/Bonn/Frankfurt am Main, Mauricio Kagel, Ein Brief
 1987, Köln/Bonn/Frankfurt am Main, Wolfgang Rihm, Chiffre VII
 1987, Köln/Bonn/Frankfurt am Main, Heiner Goebbels, Thränen des Vaterlandes
 1987, Köln/Bonn/Frankfurt am Main, Karlheinz Stockhausen, Xi, Drachenkampf und Argument, Vision und Donnerstags-Abschied (Michaels Abschied), (Karlheinz Stockhausen, Kathinka Pasveer, Markus Stockhausen, Nicholas Isherwood, Mike Svoboda, Andreas Boettger, Julian Pike, Michael Obst, Michèle Noiret, Jean Christian Jalon)
 1988, Hongkong, Morton Feldman, Palais de mari
 1988, Hongkong, John Cage, Song Books I-II
 1988, Hongkong, Brian Ferneyhough, String Quartet Nr. 3
 1988, Hongkong, Philip Glass, Opening
 1988, Hongkong, Gérard Grisey, Talea
 1988, Hongkong, Hans Werner Henze, El Cimarrón
 1988, Hongkong, Liza Lim, Pompes Funèbres
 1988, Hongkong, Helmut Lachenmann, Staub
 1988, Hongkong, Tan Dun, In Distance
 1988, Hongkong, Toru Takemitsu, Orion and the Pleiades
 1989, Amsterdam, Unsuk Chin, Canzone II
 1989, Amsterdam, Unsuk Chin, Gradus ad infinitum* 1989, Amsterdam, Stefano Gervasoni, Un recitativo
 1989, Amsterdam, Fausto Romitelli, Have your trip
 1989, Amsterdam, Kaija Saariaho, Nymphea (Arditti Quartet)
 1990, Oslo, Uros Rojko, Der Atem der verletzten Zeit
 1990, Oslo, Iannis Xenakis, Epicycles
 1990, Oslo, Alfred Schnittke, Concerto Grosso I
 1990, Oslo, Giacinto Scelsi, Ygghur
 1990, Oslo, Louis Andriessen, La Voce
 1990, Oslo, John Adams, Shaker Loops
 1990, Oslo, Daniel Ott, Zampugn
 1990, Oslo, Mauricio Kagel, Musik für Tasteninstrumente und Orchester
 1990, Oslo, Toru Takemitsu, Rain Spell
 1990, Oslo, György Ligeti, Ramifications
 1990, Oslo, Krzysztof Penderecki, Viola concerto
 1990, Oslo, Vinko Globokar, Kolo
 1990, Oslo, Tristan Murail, Allégories
 1990, Oslo, Gérard Grisey, Partiels
 1991, Zürich, Rolf Liebermann, 3 x 1 = CH + X
 1991, Zürich, Klaus Huber, Erniedrigt – geknechtet – verlassen – verachtet...
 1991, Zürich, Heinz Holliger, Scardanelli-Zyklus
 1991, Zürich, Karlheinz Stockhausen, In Freundschaft
 1991, Zürich, Karlheinz Stockhausen, Mikrophonie I
 1991, Zürich, Wolfgang Rihm, Hölderlin-Fragmente
 1991, Zürich, Friedrich Cerha, 2nd String Quartet
 1991, Zürich, Liza Lim, Voodoo Child
 1991, Zürich, Mauricio Kagel, Sonant
 1992, Warszawa, Krzysztof Penderecki, The Devils of Loudun
 1992, Warszawa, Matthias Pintscher, 2nd String Quartet
 1992, Warszawa, Daniel Ott, Molto semplicemente
 1992, Warszawa, Hans Wüthrich-Mathez, Annäherungen an Gegenwart
 1992, Warszawa, Henryk Mikołaj Górecki, Beatus Vir
 1993, Mexiko-City, Helmut Lachenmann, Reigen seliger Geister (Arditti Quartet)
 1993, Mexiko-City, Brian Ferneyhough, 4th String Quartet (Arditti Quartet)
 1993, Mexiko-City, Hilda Paredes, Oxkintok
 1993, Mexiko-City, Salvatore Sciarrino, Esplorazione del bianco
 1993, Mexiko-City, Conlon Nancarrow, Estudios #21 (canon X), #3a (from Boogie-Woogie Suite), #36, #12, #29, #43, Cuarteto No. 1, #37, #41c, Contraption #1, Toccata for violin and mechanic piano, Cuarteto No. 3 (Arditti Quartet)
 1994, Stockholm, Caspar Johannes Walter, Durchscheinende Etüden, Simultankonzept IV
 1994, Stockholm, Fausto Romitelli, La Sabbia del Tempo
 1994, Stockholm, Uros Rojko, Et puis plus rien le rève
 1994, Stockholm, Klaus Huber, Des Dichters Pflug
 1994, Stockholm, Rolf Riehm, Weeds in Ophelia’s Hair
 1994, Stockholm, Henri Pousseur, Scambi
 1994, Stockholm, Luciano Berio, Perspectives
 1995, Ruhrgebiet, Peter Eötvös, Psychokosmos
 1995, Ruhrgebiet, György Kurtág, Grabstein für Stephan op. 15c (Kölner Rundfunk-Sinfonieorchester)
 1995, Ruhrgebiet, György Kurtág, Stele op. 33 (Kölner Rundfunk-Sinfonieorchester)
 1995, Ruhrgebiet, Luigi Nono, Caminantes … Ayacucho (Experimentalstudio der Heinrich-Strobel-Stiftung des SWF)
 1995, Ruhrgebiet, George Crumb, Echoes of Time and the River, Four Processionals for Orchestra
 1995, Ruhrgebiet, Morton Feldman, Piano and Orchestra
 1995, Ruhrgebiet, Giacinto Scelsi, Hymnos
 1995, Ruhrgebiet, Olga Neuwirth, Spleen
 1995, Ruhrgebiet, Georg Friedrich Haas, Nacht-Schatten (Klangforum Wien, Peter Rundel)
 1995, Ruhrgebiet, Beat Furrer, Studie II – A un moment de terre perdu (Klangforum Wien, Peter Rundel)
 1995, Ruhrgebiet, Hans Werner Henze, Symphonie Nr. 7 (BBC Symphony Orchestra London, Peter Eötvös)
 1995, Ruhrgebiet, John Cage, FOUR for string quartet (Arditti Quartet)
 1995, Ruhrgebiet, Sam Hayden, Picking Up the Pieces
 1996, København, Caspar Johannes Walter, Durchscheinende Etüden I-VIII/c
 1996, København, Olga Neuwirth, Sans Soleil
 1996, København, Unsuk Chin, Akrostichon-Wortspiel
 1996, København, Francis Dhomont, Espace/Escape
 1996, København, Jonathan Harvey, Advaya
 1996, København, Carola Bauckholt, In gewohnter Umgebung II
 1996, København, Alban Berg, Lulu
 1996, København, Mauricio Kagel, Interview avec D.
 1996, København, Toshio Hosokawa, Interim
 1996, København, Elliott Carter, Con Leggerezza Pensosa
 1997, Seoul, Gilbert Amy, Trois Scènes
 1997, Seoul, Brian Ferneyhough, On Stellar Magnitudes
 1997, Seoul, Mauricio Kagel, Westen
 1997, Seoul, Carola Bauckholt, Treibstoff
 1997, Seoul, Gérard Grisey, Les Chants de l’Amour
 1997, Seoul, Thomas Kessler, Voice Control
 1997, Seoul, John Cage, Music for Five
 1997, Seoul, Isang Yun, Violin Concerto
 1998, Manchester, Peter Maxwell Davies, Worldes Blis (BBC Symphony Orchestra London, Sir Peter Maxwell Davies)
 1998, Manchester, Sofia Gubaidulina, De profundis
 1998, Manchester, Harrison Birtwistle, Pulse Shadows (Arditti Quartet)
 1998, Manchester, Luciano Berio, Glosse (Arditti Quartet)
 1998, Manchester, Brian Ferneyhough, String Trio (Arditti Quartet)
 1998, Manchester, Just before (Rosas Dance Company, Anne Teresa De Keersmaeker), Ictus Ensemble,
 1998, Manchester, Beat Furrer, Time Out
 1998, Manchester, Luciano Berio, Ekphrasis (continuo II), (Hallé Orchestra, Kent Nagano)
 1998, Manchester, Kaija Saariaho, Château de l’âme, (Hallé Orchestra, Kent Nagano)
 1998, Manchester, Salvatore Sciarrino, Waiting for the Wing
 1998, Manchester, Olivier Messiaen, Cinq Rechants (BBC Singers)
 1998, Manchester, Mauricio Kagel, Orchestrion-Straat (London Sinfonietta, James Wood)
 1999, Romania/Moldavia, Rebecca Saunders, Into the Blue
 2000, Luxembourg, Morton Feldman, For Philip Guston
 2000, Luxembourg, Moritz Eggert, Der Andere (after the novel The Outsider by H.P. Lovecraft)
 2000, Luxembourg, Mauricio Kagel, Duodramen
 2000, Luxembourg, Tan Dun, The Gate, Orchestral Theatre IV (BBC Symphony Orchestra, Tan Dun)
 2002, Hongkong, Krzysztof Penderecki, Concerto Grosso
 2002, Hongkong, Terry Riley, In C
 2002, Hongkong, Thomas Adès, Arcadiana
 2002, Hongkong, Shintaro Imai, La litte bleue
 2002, Hongkong, Kaija Saariaho, Graal Theatre
 2002, Hongkong, Guo Wenjing, Melodies of Western Yunnan
 2003, Slovenia, John Zorn, Contes de fées
 2003, Slovenia, Friedrich Cerha, Five Pieces
 2003, Slovenia, Krzysztof Penderecki, Sinfonietta No. 2 (RTV Slovenia Symphony Orchestra)
 2003, Slovenia, Philippe Manoury, Metal (Percussions de Strasbourg)
 2003, Slovenia, Klaus Huber, Intarsi
 2003, Slovenia, Vinko Globokar, Zlom, Blinde Zeit, Eppure si muove (Klangforum Wien, Vinko Globokar)
 2004, Switzerland, Carola Bauckholt, Hubschrauber
 2004, Switzerland, Oscar Bianchi, De rerum natura
 2004, Switzerland, Elliott Carter, Dialogues pour piano et orchestre (Orchestre de Chambre de Lausanne)
 2004, Switzerland, Unsuk Chin, Violin Concerto
 2004, Switzerland, Brian Ferneyhough, Opus Contra Naturam (Ensemble Contrechamps)
 2004, Switzerland, Lars Petter Hagen, Voices to voices, lip to lip
 2004, Switzerland, Michael Jarrell, Abschied (Ensemble Contrechamps)
 2004, Switzerland, Heinz Holliger, Turm Musik (Orchestre de Chambre de Lausanne)
 2005, Zagreb, Aaron Cassidy, Metallic Dust
 2005, Zagreb, Panayiotis Kokoras, Holophony
 2005, Zagreb, Wolfgang Rihm, Chiffre VI
 2005, Zagreb, Fausto Romitelli, Amok Koma
 2005, Zagreb, Beat Furrer, Presto con fuoco
 2005, Zagreb, Uri Caine, Trio
 2006, Stuttgart, German Toro-Pérez, Stadtplan von New York (ensemble mosaik, Enno Poppe)
 2006, Stuttgart, Mauricio Kagel, Phonophonie
 2006, Stuttgart, Johannes Kreidler, RAM microsystems
 2006, Stuttgart, Panayiotis Kokoras, Paranormal
 2006, Stuttgart, Dai Fujikura, Okeanos Breeze (Ensemble recherche)
 2006, Stuttgart, Jennifer Walshe, meanwhile, back at the ranch
 2006, Stuttgart, Fausto Romitelli, An Index of Metals (Ensemble musikFabrik, Barbara Hannigan)
 2006, Stuttgart, Julio Estrada, Murmullos del páramo (Neue Vocalsolisten Stuttgart, Mike Svoboda, Ko Ishikawa, Stefano Scodanibbio, Llorenç Barber, Magnus Andersson)
 2013, Kosice/Bratislava/Wien, Unsuk Chin, snagS&Snarls
 2013, Kosice/Bratislava/Wien, Beat Furrer, Phasma
 2013, Kosice/Bratislava/Wien, Arvo Pärt, Spiegel im Spiegel
 2013, Kosice/Bratislava/Wien, Kaija Saariaho, Aile du songe
 2013, Kosice/Bratislava/Wien, Jennifer Walshe, Silently & Very fast* 2014, Wroclaw, Thomas Vaquié, O (Omicron)
 2014, Wroclaw, Frederik Neyrinck, Contr’Action II (Klangforum Wien)
 2014, Wroclaw, Samuel Holloway, Village (Klangforum Wien)
 2014, Wroclaw, Pierluigi Billone, Eben und anders (Klangforum Wien)
 2014, Wroclaw, Peter Eötvös, Angels in America
 2014, Wroclaw, Krzysztof Penderecki, Paradise Lost
 2014, Wroclaw, Ryoji Ikeda, Datamatics
 2014, Wroclaw, György Ligeti, Lux Aeterna
 2014, Wroclaw, Stefan Prins, Piano Hero #1
 2015, Ljubljana, Hector Parra, inFALL
 2015, Ljubljana, Vito Žuraj, Hawk-Eye
 2016, Tongyeong, Isao Matsushita, Prayer of the Firmament (Changwon Philharmonic Orchestra)
 2016, Tongyeong, Pierre Boulez, Dérive (Hong Kong New Music Ensemble)
 2016, Tongyeong, Randolph Peters, Hallucinations (Gyeonggi Philharmonic Orchestra)
 2018, Beijing, Jia Guoping, The Pine-soughing Valley (China National Symphony Orchestra)
 2018, Beijing, Caleb Burhans, Escape Wisconsin (Alarm Remix) (Alarm Will Sound)
 2018, Beijing, Guo Wenjing, Wild Fire (Bamboo Flute Concerto Nr. 2) (Hanzhou Philharmonic Orchestra)
 2019, Tallinn, Wim Henderickx, Blossoming. Three Prayers for a Better World (Estonian Philharmonic Chamber Choir, Kaspars Putnins)
 2019, Tallinn, Alexander Schubert, Star Me Kitten
 2019, Tallinn, Stefan Prins, Generation Kill – offspring 1
 2019, Tallinn, Liza Lim, ''Burning House

References

External links
Official website

Music festivals in Germany
Contemporary music organizations
Organizations established in 1922
Organisations based in Salzburg
Music festivals established in 1922
International cultural organizations
Music festival organizations